Appleton 
is a city in Outagamie, Calumet, and Winnebago counties in the U.S. state of Wisconsin. Appleton is the county seat of Outagamie County. As of the 2020 Census it had a population of 75,644, making it the sixth largest city in Wisconsin. Appleton is a part of the Fox Cities metropolitan area, the third largest in the state behind Milwaukee and Madison.

Appleton serves as the heart of the Fox River Valley, which is home to Lawrence University, the Fox Cities Exhibition Center, Fox Cities Performing Arts Center, Fox River Mall, Neuroscience Group Field at Fox Cities Stadium, Appleton International Airport, and the Valley's two major hospitals: St. Elizabeth Hospital and ThedaCare Regional Medical Center–Appleton. It also hosts regional events such as Octoberfest and the Mile of Music.

History

Native American history

The territory where Appleton is today was traditionally occupied by the Ho-Chunk and the Menominee. The Menominee Nation ceded the territory to the United States in the Treaty of the Cedars in 1836, with Chief Oshkosh representing the Menominee. The treaty came at the end of several years of negotiations between the Menominee, the Ho-Chunk and the federal government about how to accommodate the Oneida, Stockbridge-Munsee, and Brothertown peoples who were removed from New York to Wisconsin. The Ho-Chunk never ratified the final treaty as only the Menominee ceded land. In the Menominee language, Appleton is known as Ahkōnemeh, or "watches for them place".

The first European settlers in Appleton were fur traders seeking to do business with Fox River Valley Native Americans. Hippolyte Grignon built the White Heron in 1835 to house his family and serve as an inn and trading post.

European settlement
Appleton was settled in 1847. It was founded as three unincorporated villages along the Fox River. From south to north along the river, these were Grand Chute, Appleton, and Lawesburg. In 1853, the three were merged into the single incorporated Village of Appleton. John F. Johnston was the first resident and village president. Lawrence University, also founded in 1847, was backed financially by Amos A. Lawrence and originally known as the Lawrence Institute. Samuel Appleton, Lawrence's father-in-law from New England who never visited Wisconsin, donated $10,000 to the newly founded college library, and the town took his name in appreciation.

The paper industry, beginning with the building of the first paper mill in the city in 1853, has been at the forefront of the development of Appleton. In order to provide electricity to the paper industry, the nation's first hydro-electric central station, the Vulcan Street Plant on the Fox River, began operation on September 30, 1882. The power plant also powered the Hearthstone House, the first residence in the world powered by a centrally located hydroelectric station using the Edison system.

Shortly thereafter, in August 1886, Appleton was the site for another national first, the operation of a commercially successful electric streetcar company. Electric lights replaced gas lamps on College Avenue in 1912. Appleton also had the first telephone in Wisconsin, and the first incandescent light in any city outside of the East Coast.

The community was incorporated as a city on March 2, 1857, with Amos Storey as its first mayor. Early in the 20th century, it adopted the commission form of government. In 1890, 11,869 people lived in Appleton; in 1900, there were 15,085; in 1910, 16,773; in 1920, 19,571; and in 1940, 28,436.

Significant annexations to the city, taken from the Town of Grand Chute, were performed in the next two decades. The first, the "Glendale" district, was completed on November 8, 1941, growing Appleton north past Glendale Avenue. Another became official on December 22, 1950 after multi-year disputes, when the unincorporated villages of Bell Heights and Whispering Pines were annexed into the city from Grand Chute. Bell Heights added new area to the northwest edge of Appleton, and Whispering Pines, to the northeast, would include land where Appleton Memorial Hospital would later be built. Bell Heights and Whispering Pines increased the population of the city by ten percent, and its area by twenty percent, overnight.

Appleton's tallest building, the 222 Building was built in 1952. The Valley Fair Shopping Center, built in 1954, laid claim to being the first enclosed shopping mall in the United States, although this claim is disputed by other malls. In 2007 most of the structure was demolished, leaving only its east wing and a movie theater. A Pick 'n Save Food Center now stands in its place.

From approximately 1930–1970, Appleton was a sundown town: black people were not allowed to stay overnight, and none lived within its city limits by 1930. In 1936, the Institute of Paper Chemistry tried to hire the famous African-American chemist Percy Julian, but could not figure out how to do this without running afoul of what was stated as "an arcane law on the City of Appleton's books". A fight over Julian's employment ensued, and he was hired by Glidden in Chicago instead. Appleton's sundown status was largely de facto and not de jure; it stood by unwritten consensus and enforcement, such as by police strongly encouraging black people to leave town after dark. A partial exception was made for opera singer Marian Anderson when she sang at Lawrence University in 1941; she was allowed to stay overnight in the Conway Hotel, but even then was not allowed to eat dinner in public.

Following the Flint water crisis, a report of Wisconsin Rust Belt cities showed high levels of lead contamination in the water of Appleton, with children under the age of 1 testing positive for lead. With a state average of 1.9 per 100 for this age group, Appleton tested at 4.5 per 100 for the same age group.

Geography

Appleton is located at  (44.278819, −88.392625).

Climate
Appleton has a humid continental climate typical of Wisconsin. Summers are warm to hot and winters are rather cold in comparison. Precipitation is relatively moderate compared to other areas close to the Great Lakes, which means lesser snowfall in winter than in many other cold areas.

This is tied for the second highest dew point ever observed in the United States.

Being inland from Lake Michigan, Appleton is prone to temperature extremes. The coldest maximum on record is  set in 1994 and the warmest minimum being  in 1912. On average, the coldest maximum temperature of the year during the normals between 1991 and 2020 was at a frigid  and the warmest minimum averaged .

Demographics

Appleton is the principal city of the Appleton–Oshkosh–Neenah CSA, a Combined Statistical Area which includes the Appleton (Calumet and Outagamie counties) and Oshkosh–Neenah (Winnebago County) metropolitan areas, which had a combined population of 392,660 at the 2010 census and an estimated population of 409,881 as of 2019.

2020 census
As of the census of 2020, the city's population was 75,644. Ethnically, the population was 7.3% Hispanic or Latino of any race. When grouping both Hispanic and non-Hispanic people together by race, the city was 80.1% White, 6.4% Asian, 3.13% Black or African American, 0.9% Native American, 0.1% Pacific Islander, 3.2% from other races, and 6.5% from two or more races.

The 2020 census population of the city included 318 people incarcerated in adult correctional facilities and 1,275 people in student housing.

According  to the American Community Survey estimates for 2016-2020, the median income for a household in the city was $61,475, and the median income for a family was $76,791. Male full-time workers had a median income of $51,431 versus $41,564 for female workers. The per capita income for the city was $33,282. About 7.8% of families and 10.3% of the population were below the poverty line, including 15.8% of those under age 18 and 6.4% of those age 65 or over. Of the population age 25 and over, 92.6% were high school graduates or higher and 33.6% had a bachelor's degree or higher.

2010 census
As of the 2010 census, there were 72,623 people, 28,874 households, and 18,271 families residing in the city. The racial makeup of the city was 87.5% White, 1.7% African American, 0.7% Native American, 5.9% Asian, 2.2% from other races, and 2.0% from two or more races. Hispanic or Latino of any race were 5.0% of the population.

There were 28,874 households, of which 33.0% had children under the age of 18 living with them, 48.7% were married couples living together, 10.5% had a female householder with no husband present, 4.1% had a male householder with no wife present, and 36.7% were non-families. 29.5% of all households were made up of individuals, and 9% had someone living alone who was 65 years of age or older. The average household size was 2.43 and the average family size was 3.04.

The median age in the city was 35.3 years. 25% of residents were under the age of 18; 10.1% were between the ages of 18 and 24; 27.7% were from 25 to 44; 26.1% were from 45 to 64; and 11.3% were 65 years of age or older. The gender makeup of the city was 49.5% male and 50.5% female.

Crime
FBI crime statistics for 2009 list the crime rate (per 100,000 population) for Appleton as follows:

Government
Appleton is governed via the mayor-council system. The mayor appoints department heads, subject to council approval. The city attorney is elected every four years in a citywide vote. The council, known as the common council or city council, consists of 15 members, called alderpersons, all of whom are elected to two-year terms from individual districts.

The current mayor of Appleton, Jake Woodford, was elected in 2020 to his first four-year term.  The first mayor of Appleton was Amos Story, elected in April 1857.  The longest-serving mayor was Timothy Hanna, who served from 1996 through 2020.

Mayors of Appleton 
Partial of list of Appleton's past mayors:

Legislative and Congressional representation

Appleton is represented by Mike Gallagher (R) in the United States House of Representatives, and by Ron Johnson (R) and Tammy Baldwin (D) in the United States Senate. In the Wisconsin state legislature, Appleton is divided among four State Assembly Districts (3rd, 55th, 56th, 57th) and two State Senate Districts (1st, 19th). As of the 2018–2019 legislative session, the following representatives serve these districts:
 3rd Assembly District: Ron Tusler (R–Harrison)
 55th Assembly District: Rachael Cabral-Guevara (R–Fox Crossing)
 56th Assembly District: David Murphy (R–Greenville)
 57th Assembly District: Lee Snodgrass (D–Appleton)
 1st Senate District: André Jacque (R–DePere)
 19th Senate District: Roger Roth (R–Appleton)

Transportation
The city owns Valley Transit, a network of bus lines serving the Fox Valley. There are also several taxi operators in the city. Valley Transit operates routes that generally begin service as early as 5:45 AM and run until as late as 10:40 PM Monday through Saturday. Frequencies are usually every hour and every half-hour on certain routes during peak morning and afternoon times on weekdays. There is no service on Sunday. Amtrak and Lamers offer intercity buses serving such locations as Green Bay, Madison, Oshkosh, Fond du Lac, Milwaukee, and Chicago.

In April 2021, Bird Rides launched a pilot program with 100 rentable electric scooters that users can operate throughout most of the city. The founder of the company Travis VanderZanden grew up in the Appleton area.

Appleton is served by multiple intercity buses serving Green Bay, Wausau, Milwaukee and other destinations.

Roads

Rail
Appleton is crisscrossed by the former main lines of the Chicago and North Western Railway (southwest-northeast) and the Milwaukee, Lake Shore and Western Railway (roughly southeast–northwest, and now largely abandoned except for local service to area paper mills and other industries). A north-south branch of the former Wisconsin Central Railroad passes on the west side of the city. All rail service is now operated by Canadian National Railway. Appleton has no intercity passenger rail service, although studies are being undertaken on the feasibility of extending Amtrak rail service to the Fox Cities and Green Bay.

Airport
The Appleton International Airport (ATW) is located at the west end of College Avenue, two miles west of Interstate 41 and six miles west of downtown Appleton.

Education

Appleton is served by the Appleton Area School District, which has three high schools, four middle schools, seventeen elementary schools, and sixteen charter schools. The district's main public high schools are Appleton East, Appleton North, and Appleton West.

The Wisconsin Evangelical Lutheran Synod (WELS) has four Christian elementary schools in Appleton: Mount Olive Lutheran School (Pre-K–8), Riverview Lutheran School (Pre-K–8), St. Paul Lutheran School (Pre-K–8), and St. Peter Lutheran School (Pre-K–8).

Appleton has two parochial high schools: Roman Catholic Xavier High School and Fox Valley Lutheran High School. Appleton also has charter high schools, including: Fox Cities Leadership Academy, Renaissance Academy, Appleton Technical Academy, and Tesla Engineering.

Appleton is home to Lawrence University, a private liberal arts college, and Fox Valley Technical College. Globe University, Concordia University Wisconsin, and Rasmussen College have branch campuses in the city. The University of Wisconsin–Fox Valley, a two-year campus of the University of Wisconsin System, is located in nearby Menasha.

In recent years, Appleton has emerged as a center for innovation in technology education, particularly in the area of K–12 technology education: the student-driven Appleton Youth Education Initiative has partnered with Microsoft Philanthropies, Plexus Corp., Miron Construction, Schneider National, and Stellar Blue Technologies to organize the Appleton Tech Clinic and HackAppleton, a popular annual hackathon that draws students from all over Wisconsin.

The city and surrounding area are served by the Appleton Public Library, which was chartered by the city in 1897 and as of 2010 has a collection of over 600,000 items. The library offers free wifi as well as printing and faxing for a small fee.

Economy

Largest employers
As of 2020, the largest employers in the city were:

Companies headquartered in Appleton
Air Wisconsin
Armament Systems and Procedures, Inc.
Fleet Farm
John Birch Society
Miller Electric
New Leaf Paper Inc
Pierce Manufacturing
SECURA Insurance
C3 Corporation

Health care
The city is served by two hospitals:
 ThedaCare Regional Medical Center-Appleton
 St. Elizabeth Hospital

Tourism

Appleton tourist attractions include the Hearthstone House, the four-story mansion that was the first house in US to be powered by hydroelectricity at its completion in 1881. The History Museum at the Castle contains exhibits on Fox River Valley history, including a gallery showcasing Edna Ferber, a Harry Houdini exhibit, and other traveling exhibits. The Paper Discovery Center has historic paper-making machines on display and an exhibit on the history of paper. The Fox River Mall is the second-largest mall in Wisconsin. Other local malls include Northland Mall, and City Center Plaza.

In 2013, Houdini Plaza, on the corner of College Avenue and Appleton Street, was renovated. The project cost around $1.5 million with most of that paid by the city itself. The plaza, known as the 'front yard' of downtown Appleton holds roughly 55 events each year, including summer concerts and part of the downtown farmers market.

Parks
The city of Appleton has 24 neighborhood parks and four community parks in its park system. The neighborhood parks range in size from two acres to 16 acres, while the community parks range in size from 25 acres to 139 acres.

Memorial Park is the largest of the community parks, covering 139 acres. The park's facilities include: seven baseball/softball fields, playground equipment, an indoor ice skating rink, a sledding hill, a picnic pavilion, a catch-and-release fishing pond, grills, and a warming shelter. The park provides a firework display for the Appleton community during the 4th of July holiday.

City Park, established in 1882, is the oldest park in the Appleton park system. The Trout Museum of Art uses the park for its Art in the Park showcase. The show features over 200 artists that attract over 25,000 art enthusiasts annually. Pierce Park is the site of weekly Appleton City Band concerts held during the summer, and of the annual Appleton Old Car Show and Swap Meet. Pierce Park and Telulah Park each feature a disc-golf course. Erb Park and Mead Park each feature a public aquatics facility. Jones Park is the site of the finish line for the Santa Scamper run held during the annual Appleton Christmas Parade, and features an outdoor hockey rink in the winter.

Notable people

In Pop Culture
Inside Job mentions Appleton several times in the final episode of the show. The main character, Reagan Ridley, finds herself stuck in either choosing the love of her life Ron and changing their identities and moving to Appleton or keeping her current plans and having the opportunity to "rule the world" in Cognito Inc.

Sister cities
Appleton is twinned with:
 Chinandega, Chinandega Department, Nicaragua
 Kan'onji, Kagawa, Japan

Points of interest
 The Trout Museum of Art
 Fox Cities Performing Arts Center
 Fox Cities Exhibition Center
 Fox River Mall
 Fox Valley Technical College
 Gardens of the Fox Cities
 Goodland Field
 Hearthstone Historic House Museum
 History Museum at the Castle
 J. B. Courtney Woolen Mills
 John Hart Whorton House
 Lawrence University
 St. Paul Evangelical Lutheran Church
 Temple Zion and School
 Zion Lutheran Church
 Neuroscience Group Field at Fox Cities Stadium, home of the Wisconsin Timber Rattlers (Minor League-Class A Midwest League)

References

Further reading

 Raney, William F. "Appleton". Wisconsin Magazine of History, vol. 33, no. 2 (December 1949): 135–151.

External links

 
 City of Appleton
 

 
Cities in Calumet County, Wisconsin
Cities in Wisconsin
Cities in Outagamie County, Wisconsin
Cities in Winnebago County, Wisconsin
County seats in Wisconsin
Sundown towns in Wisconsin
Appleton–Fox Cities metropolitan area